Gerard Eamonn Greene (born 12 November 1973 in Chatham, Kent) is a Northern Irish professional snooker player. He represents Northern Ireland in international events, as his parents are from Belfast.

Greene has enjoyed moderate success in his career, reaching his highest ranking, 26th, for the 2004–05 season, and has reached one ranking final, at the 2014 Players Championship Grand Final, where he lost 4–0 to Barry Hawkins. Alongside this, Greene reached a ranking semi-final, at the 2007 Grand Prix, losing to the eventual champion Marco Fu, and five quarter-finals.

Representing Northern Ireland with teammate Mark Allen, he reached the final of the 2011 World Cup, where they lost to China.

Greene has qualified for the World Championship five times without winning a match at the Crucible Theatre, although he twice drew the defending champion – John Higgins in 1999, and Peter Ebdon in 2003. He was ranked within the world's top 64 players from 1997 until he fell off the main tour, losing his professional status, in 2016.

Career

Early career 

Greene turned pro and joined the professional ranks in 1993/94 at the age of 20.  In 1995/96 he got to the latter stages of three events and was up 38 places to 72nd in the World Rankings. In 1997 he got to his first ranking Quarter-final in the UK Championship by beating Ian Brumby 6–5 in the first round, Steve Davis 6–2 in the second round, Andy Hicks 9–6 in the third round, and Gary Ponting 9–6 in the last 16, taking him to the Quarter-finals where he lost 6–9 to Ronnie O'Sullivan.

2003/2004 
He started the 2003/04 season in superb form reaching the British Open quarter final and the last 32 of the UK Championship beating Joe Swail 9–4 in the first round, then losing 9–7 to Matthew Stevens. He also reached the last 32 of the LG Cup.  He was briefly provisionally in the top 16 but then suffered a mid season slump.  Things picked up a little later in the campaign and he was assured of a place in the top 32 for the first time at number 26, and overtook Swail to become the number one player from Northern Ireland.

2004/2005 
He then had some problems with his cue and his form suffered during the 2004/5 season when he failed in all but two of the ranking events, and despite reaching the Irish Masters quarter final he found himself back down to 38th in the rankings.

2006/2007 
He returned to the top 32 after 2006/2007, the highlight being a run to the last 16 of the Northern Ireland Trophy.

2007/2008 
He reached his first ranking semi-final at the 2007 Grand Prix.  Greene came through Group B which included Ronnie O'Sullivan, Steve Davis, Dominic Dale and qualifiers Tom Ford and Mark Joyce.  He beat Davis and Dale 4–0, Ford 4–3 and Joyce 4–2, his only defeat coming at the hands of Ronnie O'Sullivan, 4–2. He defeated qualifier Ricky Walden 5–0 in the last 16 with breaks of 101 and 91. In his quarter-final he faced Joe Perry, who he defeated 5–3 with breaks of 68, 57, 123 and rounding of the match with a 53. Eventual champion Marco Fu edged him out 6–5 in the semi-final. For a while before this tournament, he had no snooker club to practice in.

Showing his best form for years, he also reached the Quarter-final of the 2007 Northern Ireland Trophy, beating Liang Wenbo (5–2) in the first round. Then he beat former World Champions Mark Williams (5–3) and Ken Doherty (5–1) on the way. His run ended in the hands of Mark Allen, who he lost to 5–3. He lost form in 2008 however, failing to qualify for the World Championship after a 2–10 defeat to journeyman Mark Davis.

2008/2009 
Greene's 2008/2009 season was solid but unspectacular. He won his opening match in six of the season's eight tournaments, but only went further in two of them. Crucially, he qualified for the World Championship by defeating Liu Song and Ken Doherty (gaining revenge for a defeat Doherty inflicted on him in the Northern Ireland Trophy). He was beaten 10–5 by Ali Carter in the first round.

2009/2010 
Greene qualified for five of the six ranking events during the 2009–10 season, but once there lost in the wildcard round of the Shanghai Masters to Li Yan and in the first round of the other four. He finished the year ranked world number 28.

2010/2011 
Greene began the 2010–11 season brightly by reaching the semi-finals of the second Players Tour Championship event. He defeated Anthony McGill in the last 16 and Ricky Walden in the quarter-finals, before losing 1–4 to Barry Pinches. He played in all 12 of these minor-ranking events and reached the last 16 on three occasions, which helped him finish 25th on the Order of Merit to qualify for the Finals, where he was defeated 2–4 by Matthew Stevens in the first round. He qualified for two other ranking events, the Welsh Open and China Open, but lost in the first round on both occasions to finish the season ranked world number 32.

2011/2012 
Greene could not qualify for a single ranking event during the 2011–12 season. He also did not fare well in the Players Tour Championship events as he took part in all 12 of them but only advanced to the last 16 once to finish 57th on the PTC Order of Merit and 42nd in the world rankings.

2012/2013 
Greene could not feature in the main draw of a ranking event until the Welsh Open in February. He beat David Grace and Ali Carter to qualify, but was then whitewashed 0–4 by Sam Baird in the first round. He had a very poor season in the PTC events to finish 89th on the Order of Merit. Green's slide down the world rankings during recent years continued as he finished 56th, a drop of 14 places from the start of the season.

2013/2014 
Greene beat Martin O'Donnell 5–3 to qualify for the first ranking event of the 2013–14 season, the Wuxi Classic. At the venue he saw off Michael Wasley 5–1, before losing 5–2 to David Morris in the second round. Greene reached his first final after 20 years as a professional at the minor-ranking Paul Hunter Classic in August. He won four matches to reach the quarter-finals where he beat Joe Swail 4–1, then held his nerve against Ali Carter to win 4–3 after leading 3–0. In the final he faced Ronnie O'Sullivan and was defeated 4–0 in 44 minutes. He secured the highest break in the qualifying rounds of the International Championships, a break of 142 in a 6–5 defeat to Thepchaiya Un-Nooh. At the Ruhr Open Greene made the highest break of his professional career, a 144 in a 4–0 first round win over Germany's Phil Barnes. Greene went on to beat Nigel Bond 4–2 and then lost 4–2 to Anthony Hamilton in the last 32. His season seemed to be heading for an anti-climax as he could not win more than one match in any event until he played in the PTC Finals. His aforementioned final saw him finish 17th on the Order of Merit to qualify and he then defeated Ricky Walden 4–1 and came from 3–0 down against Anthony Hamilton to triumph 4–3. The wins kept on coming for Greene as he knocked out number one seed Mark Allen 4–2 and Marco Fu 4–2 to play in his first ranking event final. After his semi-final match with Fu, Greene stated that the week had made him feel like a professional snooker player for the first time in two years as he had been playing well against the top players. He played practice partner Barry Hawkins in the final and did not pot a ball in the first two frames and went on to be beaten 4–0, but the £38,000 runner-up's cheque is the biggest of his career to date. It also helped him climb 12 spots in the rankings to end the season as the world number 44.

2014/2015
Greene got off to a slow start in the 2014–15 season by failing to qualify for the first four ranking events. He won his first match in a ranking event at the UK Championship defeating Vinnie Calabrese 6–2. Greene made a break of 139 in his second round match against Matthew Stevens but lost 6–3. Greene won his first qualifying match for the German Masters but then lost in the final qualifying round to Li Hang. At the Welsh Open, Greene won his first match defeating Daniel Wells, but then suffered a whitewash at the hands of in form Liang Wenbo in the second round. Greene enjoyed his best run of the season in a ranking event at the Indian Open in reaching the Last 32. He defeated Ahmed Saif 4–0 in qualifying, and at the venue defeated Matthew Stevens 4–2, but was then edged out in the last 32 by Jamie Jones 4–3. Greene beat the in form Chris Wakelin 5–1 to qualify for the China Open, but was then beaten 5–2 by practice partner Barry Hawkins at the main venue. Greene participated in all 6 of the Players Tour Championship events, with his best performance a run to the last 32, defeating Neil Robertson along the way. He lost his first match only once in these events, but was only able to advance beyond the last 64 on one occasion, to finish 56th in the order of merit. At the World Championship, Greene beat Elliot Slessor 10–4 in the first qualifying round, but lost in the second qualifying round 10–6 to Mitchell Mann. Greene finished the season ranked in 40th place, from a position of 44 at the start of the season.

2015/2016
A 5–0 thrashing of David Morris saw Greene qualify for the Australian Goldfields Open, but he was the victim of a 5–0 defeat in the first round to Michael Holt. He was eliminated 6–5 in a scrappy match at the second round stage of the UK Championship against David Gilbert. Greene then lost seven of his last nine matches to finish the season as the world number 66, just outside of the top 64 who keep their places. He entered Q School, but only won two matches over the two events played to confirm his relegation from the tour.

2016/2017
Greene qualified for the Paul Hunter Classic and beat Hatem Yassin 4–0, Stuart Bingham 4–3 and Michael Georgiou 4–1, before being thrashed 4–0 by Jamie Jones in the fourth round. He was defeated 4–3 by Stephen Maguire in the opening round of the Gibraltar Open and 10–6 by Fergal O'Brien in the first round of World Championship qualifying.

2017/18
Greene played in the EBSA Play-off and saw off Ian Glover 4–2 and Steven Hallworth 4–1 to be awarded a two-year tour card.

Personal life

Greene currently lives in Rainham in Medway.

Performance and rankings timeline

Career finals

Ranking finals: 1

Minor-ranking finals: 1

Non-ranking finals: 2 (2 titles)

Team finals: 1

References

External links 

 
Gerard Greene at worldsnooker.com

1973 births
Living people
English people of Northern Ireland descent
Snooker players from Northern Ireland
Sportspeople from Chatham, Kent
World Games gold medalists
Competitors at the 2005 World Games